Women Without Tomorrow (Spanish: Mujeres sin mañana) is a 1951 Mexican drama film directed by Tito Davison and starring Leticia Palma, Manolo Fábregas and Carmen Montejo.

The film's art direction was by Edward Fitzgerald.

Cast

References

Bibliography 
 Deborah R. Vargas. Dissonant Divas in Chicana Music: The Limits of la Onda. University of Minnesota Press, 2012.

External links 
 

1951 films
1951 drama films
Mexican drama films
1950s Spanish-language films
Films directed by Tito Davison
Mexican black-and-white films
1950s Mexican films